Est, EST, est, -est, etc. may refer to:

Arts and entertainment 

 est: The Steersman Handbook, a science fiction book published in 1970
 Ed Sullivan Theater, New York, built in 1927
 Ensemble Studio Theatre, New York, founded in 1968
 Esbjörn Svensson Trio, a Swedish jazz trio
 E.S.T., a song by British band White Lies from their 2009 album To Lose My Life...
 E.S.T. - Trip to the Moon, a song by Alien Sex Fiend from their 1984 album Acid Bath

Language 
 -est, the superlative suffix in English
 -est, an archaic verb ending in English
 Estonian language (ISO 639 code: est)
 European Society for Translation Studies
 Extended standard theory, a generative grammar framework

People 
 Diana Est (born 1963), Italian singer
 EST Gee (born 1994), American rapper
 Michael Est (–1648), English composer
 Thomas Est (–1609), English printer
 Van Est, a Dutch surname

Places

Africa 
 Est Department, a former division of Ivory Coast
 Est Province, Rwanda
 Est Region (Burkina Faso)
 Est Region (Cameroon)

Europe 
 Est (Chamber of Deputies of Luxembourg constituency), an electoral constituency in Luxembourg
 Est, Netherlands, a town in Gelderland
 Estonia (ISO 3166 alpha-3 code: EST)

Science and medicine
 Edinburgh Science Triangle, a multi-disciplinary partnership in Scotland
 Electroconvulsive therapy, formerly electroshock therapy, a form of treatment
 Endodermal sinus tumor, a cancerous germ cell tumor
 Estrone sulfotransferase, an enzyme catalyzing the transformation of an unconjugated estrogen into a sulfated estrogen
 European Solar Telescope, a proposed observatory
 Expressed sequence tag, a short sub-sequence of a cDNA sequence

Technology 
 Electron spiral toroid, a claimed small stable plasma toroid
 Electronic sell-through, a method of media distribution
 Enrollment over Secure Transport, a cryptographic protocol

Time zones
 Australian Eastern Standard Time or AEST (UTC+10), see Time in Australia
 Eastern Standard Time or EST (UTC−5) in the Americas, officially "Eastern Time Zone"
 Egypt Standard Time or EGY (UTC+2)
 European Summer Time (varies from UTC to UTC+3), in several time zones, see Summer time in Europe

Other uses 
 Energy Saving Trust, a British organization for fighting climate change, formed in 1992
 Erhard Seminars Training (est), a New Age large-group awareness training program, 1971–1984
 , a Tunisian multi-sports club, founded in 1919
 Est Cola, a Thai soft drink, launched in 2012
 Effort satisficing theory, a decision-making strategy; see 
 Established; see Anniversary

See also
 East (disambiguation)